Ingrassia is an Italian surname. Notable people with the surname include:

Angelo Ingrassia, (1923–2013), American jurist
Anthony Ingrassia (1944–1995), American theatre director, producer and playwright
Ciccio Ingrassia, (1922–2003), Italian actor, comedian and film director
Frankie Ingrassia,  American actress 
Giovanni Filippo Ingrassia (1510–1580), Italian physician and anatomist
Giuseppe Ingrassia, (born 1988), Italian footballer
Julien Ingrassia, (born 1979), French rally co-driver
Paul Ingrassia, (born 1950), American journalist

Italian-language surnames